Willy Falck Hansen (4 April 1906 – 18 March 1978) was a Danish track cyclist who won a silver medal at the 1924 Summer Olympics with Edmund Hansen and gold and bronze medals at the 1928 Summer Olympics.

References

External links
Villy Hansen's profile at databaseOlympics
Denmark's first Olympic champions

1906 births
1978 deaths
Danish male cyclists
Olympic gold medalists for Denmark
Olympic silver medalists for Denmark
Olympic bronze medalists for Denmark
Olympic cyclists of Denmark
Cyclists at the 1924 Summer Olympics
Cyclists at the 1928 Summer Olympics
Olympic medalists in cycling
People from Helsingør
Medalists at the 1924 Summer Olympics
Medalists at the 1928 Summer Olympics
UCI Track Cycling World Champions (men)
Danish track cyclists
Sportspeople from the Capital Region of Denmark